The Central Union High School District (CUHSD) is the district of the 3 high schools in El Centro, California — Central Union High School (CUHS), Southwest High School (SHS), and Desert Oasis High School (DOHS). The CUHSD main office and boardroom are located adjacent to DOHS.

Governance
The Central Union School District is governed by a five-member Board of Trustees, which appoints a superintendent and other administrators, who run the daily operations of the district. Members of the board are elected at-large by voters from the communities that the CUHSD serves. Members of the board serve for a term of four years, with two or three seats up for election every two years.

2016 School Bond Ballot Measure
On March 8, 2016 the Board of Trustees unanimously voted to place Measure K, officially titled Central Union High School District Classroom Repair/School Safety Measure, on the June 7, 2016 ballot for voters living within the District, alongside the 2016 California presidential primary election. The subsequent approval of Measure K allows the CUHSD to issue $30,000,000 in local general obligation bonds in order to make repairs to old, deteriorating classrooms and buildings and upgrade classrooms, computer systems, science labs and vocational training rooms with the aim of improving student learning and achievement.

References

External links

School districts in Imperial County, California
El Centro, California